Rabie Benchergui (born March 14, 1978 in Oued Fodda, Algeria) is an Algerian international football player who last played as a forward for OMR El Annasser in the Algerian Championnat National.

National team statistics

Honours
 Won the Algerian league three times with USM Alger in 2002, 2003 and 2005
 Won the Algerian Cup twice with USM Alger in 2003 and 2004
 Reached the semi-finals of the CAF Champions League with USM Alger in 2003

References

1978 births
Algerian footballers
Algeria international footballers
Living people
ASM Oran players
USM Alger players
MO Béjaïa players
OMR El Annasser players
Association football forwards
21st-century Algerian people